Joseph E. "Skip" Brion is an American politician and attorney from the state of Pennsylvania. He is a member of the Republican Party.

Brion is a former chairman of the Chester County Republican Committee, a position he held for 15 years. He resigned from the post in 2011 when Governor Tom Corbett appointed him to fill a vacancy on the Pennsylvania Liquor Control Board. He was chairman of the PLCB from his 2011 appointment through February 2015; he remained a PLCB member until Nov. 19, 2015. He is currently a partner at the West Chester law firm of Buckley, Brion, McGuire, Morris and Sommer.

References

Living people
Pennsylvania Republicans
Year of birth missing (living people)
Saint Joseph's University alumni
Villanova University School of Law alumni

1948 births
Pennsylvania lawyers